Roberto Solis is a convicted murderer, armored car robber, and criminal. He has more than 30 aliases including Pancho Aguila, a pen name he used in prison while writing poetry. He disappeared in October 1993.

Criminal background
Solis served 23 years in prison for murdering Louis Dake, a security guard, during an armored truck robbery in 1969. He was given parole in 1992. Following his release, he met Heather Tallchief, who became employed by a security company at his urging.

In October 1993, following Solis' instructions, Tallchief drove away in an armored vehicle containing $3.1 million. The two subsequently went on the run and had a child. Tallchief gave herself up in September 2005. On March 30, 2006, she was sentenced to 63 months in prison and released on parole in June 2010, but Solis is still at large.

See also 
List of fugitives from justice who disappeared

Bibliography
 Aguila, Pancho, 1976. Hijacked. Berkeley : Twowindows Press.
 Aguila, Pancho, 1977. 11 Poems. San Jose: Mango Press.
 Aguila, Pancho, 1977. Anti-gravity. Berkeley: Aldebaran Review.
 Aguila, Pancho, 1977. Dark Smoke: Poems. San Francisco : Second Coming Press. 
 Clash, 1980 Paperback, Poetry For The People
 The Therapeutist and the 3rd Day Hunger Poem, 1978, single tri-fold sheet, Berkeley: Artaud's Elbow

References

1945 births
20th-century Mexican poets
American bank robbers
American male criminals
American male poets
American people convicted of murder
American writers of Mexican descent
Fugitives wanted by the United States
Fugitives wanted on robbery charges
Living people
Mexican people convicted of murder
Mexican male poets
People convicted of murder by California